Ticket-in, ticket-out (TITO) is a technology used in more modern slot machines. It was originally developed circa 1992 by MGM Corporation who purchased technology from a Las Vegas firm Five Star Solutions as well as barcode ticket printing technology from Jon Yarbrough before his VGT success. They also worked with Pat Greene an inventor in Boston of Triad Company who held a patent on a Bill Validator which could read bar coded tickets as well as accept cash.  MGM created a consortium of game manufacturers and developed a protocol for its custom Universal Interface Board "UIB" based on a derivative of Bally Gaming's SDS System. They contracted local firm Applied Computer Technology, Inc. to develop the UIB, its firmware, and also facilitate the organization of the consortium. Later IGT acquired the rights to the TITO patents from MGM and began to modify their own protocol called SAS to implement TITO. It is incorrectly maintained that IGT developed TITO and Bally's Easy Pay which came out many years later.

Overview
Ticket-in, ticket out (TITO) machines are used in casino slot machines to print out a slip of paper with a barcode indicating the amount of money represented. These can in turn be redeemed for cash at an automated kiosk. The machines utilize a barcode scanner built into the bill acceptor, a thermal ticket printer in place of a coin hopper (some rare machines are set up to pay with coins if the payout is less than the payout limit, and to print a ticket in situations where a handpay would normally be required) and a network interface to communicate with a central system that tracks tickets.

Consortium of Manufacturers
MGM was in the middle of construction of its major hotel in Las Vegas and invited several gaming machine manufacturers to join a consortium for its Cashless Casino experiment. In the group were Bally Gaming, IGT, Sigma Games, Universal and several others. They were all presented with the MGM UIB Protocol documents and were aided in the realization of the protocol on their gaming platforms. The first trial of the system was actually at the Desert Inn property. MGM Had situated several trailers in the parking lot where the manufacturers could bring their gaming devices for test before being installed on the Field Trial at the Desert Inn.

Completion of the IGT Field Trial in Nevada
On September 29, 2000 IGT announced that its EZ Pay Ticket System successfully completed a field trial at the Fiesta Hotel & Casino in Las Vegas, which resulted in formal written approval from the Nevada Gaming Control Board for installation throughout Nevada

Advantages and disadvantages
Like any system, TITO has its share of advantages and disadvantages.

Advantages
Hopper fills for TITO machines are virtually eliminated.
Casino patrons no longer have to wait for an attendant to perform a hand pay for large payouts.
Makes multi-denomination gaming machines possible.
Streamlines accounting procedures due to reduced cash handling
Enables ticketed bonusing, coupons and drawings.

Disadvantages
May cause some people to disassociate gambling using tickets from gambling using cash, in much the same way "credits" are indicated on some machines rather than a cash value.
Tickets can be easier to misplace than a large bucket of coins.
The lack of the sound of a big coin pay out is a turnoff for some players. Due to this, manufacturers added multimedia sound to the machines to reproduce the sound of coins falling when a prize hits.
This system is a common part of money laundering activies by criminal elements to 'wash' cash received as proceeds of crime.

References

External links

Original TITO Prototype Information – Overview

Exonumia
Slot machines